Donald Earl James (December 31, 1932 – October 20, 2013) was an American football player and coach. He served as the head coach at Kent State University from 1971 to 1974 and at the University of Washington from 1975 to 1992, compiling a career college football record of 

His 1991 Washington team won a share of the national championship after completing a  season with a decisive win over Michigan in the Rose Bowl. James was inducted into the College Football Hall of Fame as a coach

Early years
James was born in 1932 at his family's home on the outskirts of Massillon, Ohio. He was the fourth of five sons. Four of the five played football, and the eldest, Tommy, starred at Ohio State on the 1942 national championship team, and played professional football for a decade 

James attended Massillon Washington High School, played quarterback for the football team (1948, 1949), and graduated

College football and military service
James attended the University of Miami on a football scholarship, and was the quarterback for the Hurricanes in 1952 and 1953. He set Miami single-season records for completions (121), yards (1,363), and completion percentage (56.9%). He earned a bachelor's degree in education in 1954, and was commissioned as a lieutenant in the U.S. Army.

James was inducted into the University of Miami Sports Hall of Fame in 1992.

Coaching career

Assistant coaching positions
James was a graduate assistant for the Jayhawks at the University of Kansas under his former high school coach, Chuck Mather, and received a master's degree in education. He coached high school football in Florida at Southwest Miami High School in 1959, then was a college assistant coach for twelve seasons at Florida State, Michigan, and Colorado.

Kent State
James became a head coach in 1971 at Kent State in his native Ohio, where he had a  record in four years. There he coached future NFL great Jack Lambert, current college head coach Nick Saban of Alabama, and former head coach Gary Pinkel of Missouri. During his four seasons at Kent, the Golden Flashes won their only Mid-American Conference (MAC) title in 1972, and played in their first bowl game, the Tangerine Bowl. The 1973 team posted the best record in program history at 9–2.

Washington
In December 1974, James was hired by University of Washington (UW) athletic director Joseph Kearney to succeed  as head coach of the  His original contract was for four years, starting at $28,000 per year.

Like Owens, James served as Husky head coach for 18 seasons, from 1975 until August 1993. He led the Huskies to a national championship in 1991. While at Washington, James' teams won four Rose Bowls, the Orange Bowl in January 1985, and had a  record in all bowl games. Overall, James tallied a  record at Washington, including a then-record 98 wins in Pacific-10 Conference play. (Against the five current North division opponents of the Pac-12, his record was  Washington won 22 consecutive games from November 1990 to November 1992. James won national college coach of the year honors in 1977, 1984, and 1991. He was inducted into the College Football Hall of Fame in 1997.

In early November 1992, it was revealed that several Huskies players had received improper benefits. Among them, starting quarterback Billy Joe Hobert had received a series of loans totaling $50,000 made by a friend's father-in-law. At the time, the defending national champion Huskies were undefeated (8–0), ranked first in the AP poll, and second in the coaches' poll. While it was later determined the loan was neither an NCAA violation nor an institutional violation, this was the first in a series of reports by The Seattle Times and Los Angeles Times that initiated Pacific-10 Conference and NCAA investigations. These led to charges that Washington exhibited "lack of institutional control" over its handling of recruiting funds for on-campus visits and a Los Angeles booster summer jobs program. The Huskies received sanctions from both the NCAA and Pacific-10 Conference.

Though notably James and the coaching staff were not specifically cited as having broken any rules, James resigned from his head coaching position on August 22, 1993, in protest of what were considered unfair sanctions against his team for minor, unsubstantiated, or fabricated infractions. Though university president William Gerberding and athletic director Barbara Hedges had presented James the final list of penalties that all Pac-10 parties had agreed best for the football program and athletics, Gerberding argued in favor of altering the penalties against the program from a two-year TV revenue ban and one-year bowl ban, to a one-year TV revenue ban and two-year 

In a 2019 interview with The Athletic, it was cited by his wife that his resignation from head coaching probably saved his life.

Family and later years
James married his high school sweetheart, Carol Hoobler, a Massillon native who followed James to Miami where she became a cheerleader. They were married in August 1952 and had three children: Jeff, Jill, and Jeni.

On October 10, 2004 the coach raised the Seattle Seahawks 12 flag before a game at Quest Field vs. the St. Louis Rams.

James died of pancreatic cancer at his Kirkland residence in 2013 at age 80. In October 2017, the University of Washington unveiled a bronze statue of James in the northwest plaza of

Head coaching record

Overall James' record yielding . However those wins are recognized by Washington they aren't recognized by NCAA.

Pac-10 opponents
James' record at Washington against conference opponents (1975–1992)

† excludes non-conference loss to ASU (WAC) in 1975
 Wins by UCLA (1977) and ASU (1979) were later vacated, yielding

Coaching tree
James worked under five head coaches:
Chuck Mather, Kansas (1956–1957)
Perry Moss, Florida (1959)
Bill Peterson, Florida (1960–1965)
Bump Elliott, Michigan (1966–1967)
Eddie Crowder, Colorado (1968–1970)

Thirteen of James' assistant coaches became head coaches in the NCAA or NFL:
Dennis Fitzgerald, Kent State (1975–1977)
Dick Scesniak, Kent State (1983–1985)
Bob Stull, UMass (1984–1985), UTEP (1986–1988), Missouri (1989–1993)
Keith Gilbertson, Idaho (1986–1988), California (1992–1995), Washington (2003–2004)
Jim E. Mora, New Orleans Saints (1986–1996), Indianapolis Colts (1998–2001)
Nick Saban, Toledo (1990), Michigan State (1995–1999), LSU (2000–2004), Miami Dolphins (2005–2006), Alabama (2007–present)
Gary Pinkel, Toledo (1991-2000), Missouri (2001-2015)
Jim Lambright, Washington (1993–1998)
Bill Wentworth, Denison (1993–1999)
Chris Tormey, Idaho (1995–1999), Nevada (2000–2003)
Jeff Woodruff, Eastern Michigan (2000–2003)
Al Lavan, Delaware (2004–2010)
Jim L. Mora, Atlanta Falcons (2004–2006), Seattle Seahawks (2009), UCLA (2012–2017), UConn (2022–present)

See also
 List of presidents of the American Football Coaches Association
 Legends Poll

References

External links
 

1932 births
2013 deaths
American football quarterbacks
Colorado Buffaloes football coaches
Kansas Jayhawks football coaches
Kent State Golden Flashes football coaches
Miami Hurricanes football players
Washington Huskies football coaches
High school football coaches in Florida
College Football Hall of Fame inductees
University of Kansas alumni
Sportspeople from Massillon, Ohio
Sportspeople from Kirkland, Washington
Coaches of American football from Ohio
Players of American football from Ohio
Deaths from pancreatic cancer